Slavi Stalev (born 28 February 1994) is a Bulgarian footballer who plays as a defender.

Career
Stalev started his career with Cherno More Varna. He made his first team début in a 3-1 A Group away win against Svetkavitsa on 19 May 2012, coming on as a substitute for Ivelin Yanev.

External links

1994 births
Living people
Sportspeople from Varna, Bulgaria
Bulgarian footballers
Association football defenders
PFC Cherno More Varna players
PFC Dobrudzha Dobrich players
FC Chernomorets Balchik players
PFC Kaliakra Kavarna players
PFC Spartak Varna players
First Professional Football League (Bulgaria) players
Second Professional Football League (Bulgaria) players